High School Attached to Beijing University of Technology is a high school located in Chuiyangliu Middle Street, Chaoyang District, Beijing, China. It is one of the beacon high schools accredited by Beijing municipal Government.

See also
Beijing University of Technology

External links
  High School Attached to Beijing University of Technology

High schools in Beijing
Schools in Chaoyang District, Beijing
Beijing University of Technology
Beijing University of Technology